The Georg-Christoph-Lichtenberg-Preis is an arts prize of Hesse. It is awarded biannually for literature (since 1987) and the visual arts (since 1979) on a rotating basis by the district of Darmstadt-Dieburg. The winner receives a certificate as well as a donation of 10,000 euros, though it is possible for the prize money to be split evenly between two winners. A committee of fourteen jurors evaluates qualified submissions; all themes or literary genres are accepted.

The prize is named after Georg Christoph Lichtenberg, the Enlightenment physics professor and writer who was born in Ober-Ramstadt.

Past Recipients (visual arts)  
 Esteban Fekete (1979) 
 Ernst Schonnefeld (1980)
 Leo Leonhard (1982)
 Bruno Müller-Linow (1984)
 Rainer Lind (1986)
 Barbara Breisinghoff (1988) 
 Arno Jung (1990)
 Detlef Kraft (1992)
 Horst Evers alias Gerd Winter (1994) 
 Matthias Will (1996)
 Helga Griffths (1998) 
 Andrea Neumann (2001)
 Klaus Lomnitzer (2005)
 Martin Konietschke (2009)
 Kurt Wilhelm Hoffmann (2013)
 Joachim Kuhlmann (2018)

Past Recipients (literature) 
 Ursula Teicher-Maier (1987)
 Mechthild Curtius (1989)
 Iris Anna Otto (1991)
 Susanne Eva Mischke (1995)
 Rainer Wieczorek (1997)
 Silke Andrea Schuemmer (1999)
 Philip Meinhold (2003)
 Peter Kurzeck (2007)
 Andreas Maier (2011)
 Silke Scheuermann (2017)

References

German art awards
Literary awards of Hesse